Sarah Pagano (born July 23, 1991) is an American long-distance runner. She is referred to as "Spags" by friends and teammates.

Pagano began running competitively at Immaculate Heart Academy, where she won multiple state titles in both indoor and outdoor competition.

Professional
Pagano competed for Team USA at IAAF World Cross Country Championships in Kampala, Uganda. At the 2017 IAAF World Cross Country Championships, she competed at 2017 IAAF World Cross Country Championships to 30th place in 35:18 and 2018 NACAC Championships 4th place over 10,000 meters.

Sarah Pagano represented Team USA for the 7th time at 2019 Pan American Games.

NCAA

High school
A resident of Ringwood, New Jersey who attended Immaculate Heart Academy, 

Sarah Pagano earned all-county honors in 2009. 

Pagano won the NJSIAA State Girls Cross Country Championships Non Public A Group in 2007 in 19:20 and 2008 in 19:11, respectively. 

Pagano won 2008 New Jersey Non Public A 1600 and 3200 meters races.

References

External links
 Sarah Pagano Twitter Profile
 Sarah Pagano Instagram Profile
 
 Sarah Pagano All-Athletics Profile
 Sarah Pagano profile Association of Road Racing Statisticians
 Sarah Pagano profile Boston Athletic Association

1991 births
Living people
American female long-distance runners
American female middle-distance runners
Immaculate Heart Academy alumni
Syracuse Orange women's track and field athletes
World Athletics Championships athletes for the United States
People from Ringwood, New Jersey
Sportspeople from Passaic County, New Jersey
Track and field athletes from New Jersey
Athletes (track and field) at the 2019 Pan American Games
Pan American Games track and field athletes for the United States
21st-century American women